Wow! Momo is an Indian chain of fast food restaurants headquartered in Kolkata. The chain specializes in momos, momo-filled burgers (MoBurgs) and momo-based desserts. It was established in 2008 by St. Xavier's College alumni Sagar Daryani and Binod Homagai.

As of December 2021, there are around 425 outlets across 19 cities in India. Wow! Momo Foods Pvt. Ltd. operates 3 Brands; Wow! Momo, Wow! China and Wow! Chicken which was launched in December 2021. The company aims to be an IPO in a few years with plans to gain a global foothold, i.e., they want to compete with the likes of Domino's and McDonald's.

Wow Momo Foods in 2021 emerged as the most valued homegrown QSR brand in India with a valuation of ₹1,225 crores. The Company has grown its foothold completely with company operated outlets; it does not have any franchise plans as of now.

As per Fintrackr’s estimates, Wow! Momo in 2022 raised fresh investment in Series D round at a valuation of $270 million or Rs 2,130 crore, post allotment. The company’s valuation grew more than 60% in the past year as it was valued at $165-170 million in Series C round.

History 
The founders of Wow! Momo, Sagar Jagdish Daryani and Binod Kumar Homagai, first met each other at St. Xavier's College during their undergrad. With an initial amount of ₹30,000, they started the venture in 2008 at the age of 21. Wow! Momo began as a 6' by 6' kiosk in a Spencer's, which was one of their initial stores (the other one being a kiosk inside a Big Bazaar on rent for 18% of revenue share per month). While Daryani looked after brand expansion, marketing and retail operations, Homagai focused more on production and quality control. They were later joined by another St. Xavier's alumnus and friend Shah Miftaur Rahman, who took the responsibility of cost control and finance and Muralikrishnan joined as the fourth Co-founder in 2018. A friend and another St. Xavier's alumnus, to take charge of marketing, brand building and growth hacking.

Wow! Momo, in June 2017, managed to raise ₹44 crore from Lighthouse funds and through investments by Indian Angel Network. A year later, Fabindia's managing director, William Bissell, invested ₹3 crore (US$440,000) in the company, which helped Wow! Momo reach a valuation of ₹300 crore (US$45 million). And in September 2019, after an investment by Tiger Global Management of ₹130 crore (US$23 million), the valuation of the company crossed ₹860 crore (US$120 million), which led to the opening of more outlets in commercial locations like malls and tech parks.

During the COVID-19 pandemic, Wow! Momo entered into a strategic partnership with Café Coffee Day, in which they decided to share outlet space along with costs and revenue.

Awards and recognition
 Best Dim-sum product chain – Indian Restaurant Congress Award 2016
 Best Unique Retail Concept Award – Images Retail Award 2017
 Coca-Cola Golden Spoon Award – Best Quick Service Restaurant in Indian origin 2018
 Coca-Cola Golden Spoon Award – Best Innovation in Store Design 2018

References

Restaurants established in 2008
Fast-food chains of India
Fast-food franchises
Indian brands
Brand name snack foods
Companies based in Kolkata
2008 establishments in West Bengal
Indian companies established in 2008